The Day She Died is a book written by Catriona McPherson and published by Midnight Ink Books (an imprint of Llewellyn Worldwide) on 8 May 2014, which later went on to win the Anthony Award for Best Paperback Original in 2015.

References 

Anthony Award-winning works
American mystery novels
2014 American novels